"Bazardée" is a song by KeBlack released in 2016. The song has peaked at number seven on the French Singles Chart.

Charts

References

2016 singles
2016 songs
French-language songs